Egor is a Local Government Area of Edo State, Nigeria. Its headquarters are in the town of Uselu. Egor is one of the Local Government Areas that are part of the larger metropolitan area of Benin City.

It has an area of 93 km and a population of 339,899 as at the 2006 census.

The postal code of the area is 300.

Background Information 
Egor local government area is in Edo state, South-south geopolitical zone of Nigeria and has its headquarters in the town of Uselu. A number of towns and villages make up of Egor local government area and these include Okhoro, Use, Uwelu, Iguikpe, Ugbighoko, Iguediaye, Evbougide and Oghedaivbiobaa. The population of Egor local government area is estimated at 258,442 inhabitants with the area hosting members of several tribal groups such as the Esan, Bini, and the Owan. The area is home to Christians, Muslims, and traditional worshippers while the Bini, Owan and Esan languages are spoken in the area.

Geography 
Egor local government area falls under the Tropical Savannah Climate while the LGA covers a total area of 93 square kilometres. The area experiences two major seasons which are the rainy and the dry seasons while the average temperature of the area is at 28 °C. The estimated  humidity level of the Egor local government area is estimated at 68 percent.

References

Local Government Areas in Edo State